In statistics, biweight midcorrelation (also called bicor) is a measure of similarity between samples. It is median-based, rather than mean-based, thus is less sensitive to outliers, and can be a robust alternative to other similarity metrics, such as Pearson correlation or mutual information.

Derivation

where  is the identity function where,

Then we normalize so that the sum of the weights is 1:

Finally, we define biweight midcorrelation as,

Applications

Biweight midcorrelation has been shown to be more robust in evaluating similarity in gene expression networks, and is often used for weighted correlation network analysis.

Implementations
Biweight midcorrelation has been implemented in the R statistical programming language as the function bicor as part of the WGCNA package

Also implemented in the Raku programming language as the function bi_cor_coef as part of the Statistics module.

References

Parametric statistics
Covariance and correlation